On December 7, 1995, a chartered twin-turboprop Beechcraft 1900D commuter aircraft registered as  and owned and operated by Air Saint Martin crashed near Belle-Anse, Haiti. The flight was en route from Cayenne, French Guiana and Pointe-à-Pitre, Guadeloupe to Port-au-Prince, Haiti, and had been chartered by the Government of France to return illegal immigrants to Haiti from French territory. There were no survivors among its 18 passengers and 2 crew members.

Investigators determined that F-OHRK had drifted ten nautical miles off course.

See also
Prinair Flight 277

References

External links
 

Aviation accidents and incidents in 1995
Aviation accidents and incidents in Haiti
Airliner accidents and incidents caused by pilot error
Airliner accidents and incidents involving controlled flight into terrain
Air Caraïbes
Accidents and incidents by airline of France
1995 in Haiti
December 1995 events in North America
Accidents and incidents involving the Beechcraft 1900